Solly McLeod is a British actor. He has been cast as Tom Jones in the upcoming 2023 television miniseries adaptation  Tom Jones for PBS and ITV.

Career
McLeod grew up in Orkney before moving to London at age 10. From April 2021 onwards McLeod filmed four projects back-to-back with only one day to rest between each. He was in the Sky television series The Rising and HBO’s House of the Dragon before spending three months playing the eponymous hero in  Tom Jones and then filming upcoming independent survival thriller Jericho Ridge in Kosovo. 
In Tom Jones McLeod stars alongside Sophie Wilde and Hannah Waddingham. McLeod had previously had a role in Outlander. He has also cast in the Viggo Mortensen project, and reportedly a western love story, The Dead Don’t Hurt. He has been cast in an upcoming project entitled Beach Boys.

Filmography

References

External links
 

British male television actors
People from Orkney
Year of birth missing (living people)
Living people
21st-century British male actors